Chug (also called Chugpa or Duhumbi) is a Kho-Bwa language of West Kameng district, Arunachal Pradesh in India. It is closely related to Lish.

Chug is spoken only in Chug village (population 483 in 1971), located a few miles from Dirang (Blench & Post 2011:3).

Chug is spoken in Duhumbi village.  Despite speaking languages closely related to Mey (Sherdukpen), the people identify as Monpa, not Mey.

According to Lieberherr & Bodt (2017), Chug is spoken by 600 people in 3 main villages.

References

Further reading 
Bodt, Timotheus Adrianus (2017). Grammar of Duhumbi (Chugpa). Ph.D. dissertation, University of Bern.
Bodt, Timotheus Adrianus (2019). Grammar of Duhumbi (Chugpa). Leiden: Brill. 

Kho-Bwa languages
Languages of India
Endangered languages of India
Articles citing ISO change requests